Sebastian Luke (Seb) Bishop (born 1974) was the CEO of GOOP, Gwyneth Paltrow's lifestyle company, from 2011 to 2014. Prior to joining GOOP, Bishop was the International CEO of (RED), the organization created by Bono and Bobby Shriver to raise money for The Global Fund to Fight AIDS, and Tuberculosis and Malaria. He had previously started the firm Espotting at the age of 26.

Bishop was educated at Highgate School and began Espotting with his school-friend Daniel Ishag in a basement flat in 2000. He expanded the business across Europe before merging with US-based FindWhat.com in June 2004 in a deal that valued the company at $186m. He was also the Chairman of Steak, a digital marketing agency started by his brother, Oliver Bishop, with two ex-Espotting colleagues, Julian Walker and Duncan Parry. Steak was sold to agency group Dentsu in 2011, ending Bishop's time as Chairman.  

In 2007 Bishop was one of 8 British entrepreneurs featured in the Channel 4 documentary 'Millionaires' Mission.' He spent 3 weeks in a remote region of Uganda, using Western entrepreneurial skills to try and bring sustainable relief from poverty to affected communities.

Bishop and (RED)
He joined (RED) as their International CEO in September 2008.

The idea of (RED) was that the companies could make products using the (RED) logo in exchange for donating up to half their profits from those products directly to the Global Fund for AIDS programs in Africa.  

Since its launch (RED) has grown to 9 partners (and growing): American Express (UK only), Converse, Gap, Emporio Armani, Dell, Windows, Apple, Hallmark, and Starbucks. On 1 December 2008 (World AIDS Day), (RED)wire was launched – (RED)'s music subscription service.

(RED) partners and events have generated over $120 million to help eliminate AIDS in Africa through The Global Fund (January 2009).

Espotting and MIVA (now Vertro)
In 2000, at the age of 26, Bishop founded Espotting – a company that pioneered search marketing through a form of advertising on search engine results called Pay-Per-Click. He expanded the business across Europe before merging with US-based FindWhat.com in June 2004 in a deal that valued the company at $186m. In 2005, he led the global rebrand of the combined company under the MIVA name. 

Following the merger, Bishop became President and chief marketing officer of MIVA. Whilst the company never saw the revenue and global growth of other search engine advertising companies and especially Google's Adwords product, Espotting was regarded as a European pioneer of PPC advertising in the early days of this advertising format. Both Google (with their AdWords program) and Yahoo! entered the UK search advertising market in 2003 after Espotting, but became dominant in that country and globally over time.

Under Bishop's leadership, Espotting and MIVA  won a number of industry awards including 'Most Dynamic UK Media Company' (Media Momentum Awards), 'Fastest growing IT company' (Europe's 500 Awards), and 'Top 50 Creative Business' (Financial Times).

One of the youngest presidents of a NASDAQ-listed company (appointed to the role at the age of 31), Bishop had begun working in advertising at the age of 14 at Yellowhammer during his summer holidays and at 19 joined Publicis as an art director. From Publicis, he moved on to Rainey Kelly Campbell Rolfe and was part of the company when they successfully took over Y&R London. During his advertising agency years, Bishop created the award-winning campaign that launched Coca-Cola in Russia as well as campaigns for some of the world's most famous brands including Virgin, Diet Coke, HP, Renault, and Nintendo.

Millionaires' Mission
In 2007 Bishop was featured in Millionaires' Mission, a new Channel 4 documentary in which eight British business leaders spend three weeks in a remote region of Uganda, using Western entrepreneurial skills to try and bring sustainable relief from poverty to affected communities.

In the program, Bishop helped create two businesses within the local communities – a farmer's co-operative and Teach Inn, an innovative eco-tourism hotel.

The first episode of the 4-part series aired on Channel 4 in the UK on 19 September 2007.

Awards
Financial Times' "Top 50" Creative Businesses (2004)
Campaign Magazine's "A-List" (2005)
Campaign Magazine's "Faces to Watch" (1998)
Media Week's "30 Under 30" (2002)
Media & Marketing Europe's "40 Under 40" (2002)
London Stock Exchange sponsored "Technology Entrepreneur of the Year" (finalist) (2005)

References

External links
(RED)
Steak Media
AdJug
Future Plc.

Millionaires' Mission
Millionaires' Mission
Teach Inn Uganda
Edirisa

Living people
People educated at Highgate School
British businesspeople
1974 births